L.A. Blues Authority Volume II: Glenn Hughes – Blues is a solo album by former Deep Purple, Black Sabbath and Trapeze vocalist/bassist Glenn Hughes.

The album was produced under the moniker of the L.A. Blues Authority, a blues project that featured many musicians playing original blues tracks and covers. This is the only album under that name which featured only original material performed by one singer. The album was recorded in three weeks and Hughes' claims the themes in the record deal with his personal demons of the time.
This was Hughes' first solo album to be released after he kicked his drug habits in 1991  and found his 'higher power'. He hadn't released an album under his own name since 1977's Play Me Out. This marked a beginning of a highly productive period in Hughes' life that still continues.

Guest guitarists include Europe player John Norum (who had produced the album Face the Truth which featured Hughes on a number of tracks earlier in 1992), Mick Mars of Mötley Crüe, Warren DeMartini of Ratt, Richie Kotzen of Poison and Mr. Big and Mark Kendall of Great White fame.

Track listing 
"The Boy Can Sing the Blues" – 5:38 (Hughes, Erickson, Mike Varney)
"I'm the Man" – 5:45 (Hughes, Erickson)
"Here Come the Rebel" – 4:16 (Hughes, Erickson)
"What Can I Do for Ya?" – 6:16 (Hughes, Erickson)
"You Don't Have to Save Me Anymore" – 5:34 (Hughes, Erickson)
"So Much Love to Give" – 5:23 (Hughes, Erickson)
"Shake the Ground" – 6:05 (Hughes, Erickson)
"Hey Buddy (You Got Me Wrong)" – 6:12 (Hughes, Erickson, Franklin, Varney)
"Have You Read the Book?" – 4:42 (Hughes, Erickson)
"Life of Misery" – 5:15 (Hughes)
"Can't Take Away My Pride" – 4:23 (Hughes, Erickson)
"A Right to Live" – 4:32 (Hughes, Kotzen)

Personnel 

Glenn Hughes – vocals, bass on tracks 1, 3, 10, 11 and 12
Craig Erickson – all rhythm guitars, lead guitar on tracks 6 and 10
Tony Franklin – bass on tracks 2, 4, 5, 6, 7, 8 and 9
Gary Ferguson – drums
Mark Jordan – keyboards
John Norum – guitar Solos on tracks 1 and 2
Warren DeMartini – guitar solo on tracks 1, 2 and 5
Mark Kendall – lead guitar on track 3, guitar solo on track 5
Richie Kotzen – lead guitar on tracks 4 and 12
Darren Housholder – lead guitar on track 7, guitar solo on track 9
Paul Pesco – guitar solo on track 8
Mick Mars – guitar solo on track 9, slide guitar on track 11

Charts

References

External links 
 http://www.glennhughes.com/blues.html

1993 albums
Glenn Hughes albums